EGBDF may refer to:

 The notes on the lines of the treble clef and the mnemonic used by some music students to remember it, such as "Every Good Boy Deserves Fruit", with "Fruit" sometimes being replaced by "Favour", "Fudge", or "Football".  A variant is also “Every Good Boy Does Fine”.
 A number of song and album names based on the above mnemonics:
 Every Good Boy Deserves Favour (play), a play by Tom Stoppard
 Every Good Boy Deserves Favour (album), by The Moody Blues
 Every Good Boy Deserves Fudge, an album by Mudhoney

Music mnemonics